The  ("Illustrated Compendium of Buddhist Images") is a collection of Buddhist iconographic sketches said to have been painted by  of the Tosa school. Originally published in 1690 (Genroku 3) in five volumes, it comprises more than 800 sketches, inspired by the Chinese style of paintings called Paihuo, with the Buddhist icons divided into five parts and further categorized. In Edo-period Japan the Butsuzōzui compendium was the most widely distributed source for information on Buddhist and Shinbutsu deities.

However criticized for errors and misunderstanding, a revised and expanded edition, ""  was issued in 1792 (Kansei 4), a person in Ōsaka,  .

See also
Daikokunyo (goddess)
Kichijōten (goddess)

Further reading 
 Heibonsha World Encyclopedia (1935), volume 22. 
 Tosa, Hidenobu (1982) Zōho shoshū Butsuzōzui, "Von Siebold collection", . 
 Tosa, Hidenobu (1998) Butsuzōzui, Zōho Butsuzōzui, Ōzorasha, in "" volume 14, . 
 Togo, Fukiko "Two Kinds of Hindu and Buddhist Images in Nepal" Sonoda journal, Sonoda Women's University, March 1986, Issue 20, pp67-86. 
  ", The Journal of the Faculty of General Education, Sapporo University, March 1988, issue 32, pp.107-144. 
 Emoto, Hiroshi "Inuhariko, with Notes and Discussion" Otsuma Women's University, annual report. Humanities and Social Sciences, Otsuma Women's University, March 2000, issue 32, pp.71-97. 
 MIYAZAKI, Katsunori "The restoration of Siebold 'NIPPON" Kyūshū University Museum Report, Kyushu University, March 2005 volume 3, pp.23-105, . 
 YORITOMI, Motohiro "Unification of Buddhism and Shinto through the Mahabhijnajnanabhibhu-buddha" Bulletin of Buddhist Cultural Institute, Ryukoku University, Ryukoku University, 30 November 2006, issue 45, p.143. 
 MIYAZAKI, Katsunori "The Study of Comparing Color Prints in Siebold 'NIPPON'"	Kyūshū University Museum Report, Kyushu University, January 2007, volume 5, pp.1-56, . 
 KIKUFUJI, Akimichi "The Preaching of Sojun, the Compiler of the Myokonin-den", Japanese Association of Indian and Buddhist Studies, 2009, volume 58, issue 1, pp.12-19, . 
 MOCHIZUKI, Shincho "The Lotus Faith of a Wealthy Merchant Chaya Family", Journal of Indian and Buddhist Studies (Indogaku Bukkyogaku Kenkyu), Japanese Association of Indian and Buddhist Studies, 2014, volume 63, issue 1, pp.189-196, .

References

External links
Online photographic copy of the Butsuzōzui compendium (1783 edition) (Ehime University Library) 
National Diet Library of Japan. Open Access.
Handcopied version of the revised "Butsuzō zui", Kajikawa Shinji, Kyoto : Shinji Kajikawa (manual transcription) ; 1886 (Meiji  19). , . National Diet Library of Japan. Open access.

Buddhist art
Buddhist paintings
Edo-period books about Buddhism